The following is a list of Australian television ratings for the year 2021.

Network shares

Most Watched Broadcasts in 2021

Weekly ratings 
From the week beginning, 7 February 2021.

Weekly key demographics 
From the week beginning, 7 February 2021.

Key demographics shares

See also

Television ratings in Australia

References

2021
2021 in Australian television